Serbia participated in the Junior Eurovision Song Contest 2017 which took place on 26 November 2017, in Tbilisi, Georgia. Radio Television of Serbia (RTS) was responsible for organising their entry for the contest. Irina Brodić and Jana Paunović were selected from national selection to represent Serbia with the song "Ceo svet je naš".

Background

The Serbian broadcaster announced on 15 June 2017, that they would be participating at the contest to be held in Tbilisi, Georgia.

Before Junior Eurovision

Dečja Pesma Evrovizije 2017 
The singer who performed the Serbian entry for the Junior Eurovision Song Contest 2017 was selected through the singing competition Dečja Pesma Evrovizije ("Children's Eurovision Song"). On 15 June 2017 RTS revealed it will be reverting to an open selection to choose their entry after several year’s of internal selection. On 21 September 2017, it was announced that a national final will take place to determine the country's representative.

Competing entries 
Interested candidates had to submit their entries before the deadline on 15 August. A total of 18 songs were submitted to RTS which were then shortlisted to three by a panel of music editors.

Final 
The final was recorded on 28 September 2017 and broadcast on 30 September 2017 on 12:30 CET. The winners were Jana Paunović (born 7 February 2005) and Irina Brodić (born 3 November 2004) with the song "Ceo svet je naš", which was selected from the five-panel jury, who consisted of Vojkan Borisavljević (arranger and producer), Nevena Božović (singer, representative of Serbia in the Junior Eurovision Song Contest 2007), Ljiljana Ranđelović (choir conductor), Čeda Hodžić (RTS music editor) and Kiki Lesendrić (rock musician).

At Junior Eurovision
During the opening ceremony and the running order draw which took place on 20 November 2017, Serbia was drawn to perform fourteenth on 26 November 2017, following Russia and preceding Australia.

Voting

Detailed voting results

References

Junior Eurovision Song Contest
Serbia
2017